Allium lacunosum is a species of wild onion known by the common name pitted onion. It is endemic to California, where it is a common member of the flora in many types of habitat, from bayside to mountain to desert.

Description
The pitted onion, Allium lacunosum, grows from a thick-coated yellowish-brown bulb one or two centimeters long. There are usually two leaves which may be as long or longer than the stem.

The inflorescence contains up to 45 dark-veined white to pale pink flowers, each less than a centimeter long.

Varieties
There are four varieties of this species, three of which are somewhat uncommon.
Allium lacunosum var. davisiae — Southern California
Allium lacunosum var. kernense — Southern Sierra, Mojave Desert.
Allium lacunosum var. lacunosum 
Allium lacunosum var. micranthum — Central Coast interior ranges.

References

External links

Jepson Manual Treatment: Allium lacunosum
USDA Plants Profile — Allium lacunosum (pitted onion)
Flora of North America
Allium lacunosum — U.C. Photo gallery

lacunosum
Endemic flora of California
Flora of the California desert regions
Flora of the Sierra Nevada (United States)
Natural history of the California Coast Ranges
Taxa named by Sereno Watson
Flora without expected TNC conservation status